William Whitaker Landscape and House is a historic home and garden located at Crown Point, Lake County, Indiana.  The house was built in 1926, and is a two-story, "L"-shaped, Tudor Revival style brick dwelling.  It has a steeply pitched cross-gable roof with cross-timbering on the gable ends.  A two-story addition was built in 1967. The landscape was designed in the Prairie School style by Jens Jensen and built in 1929.

It was listed in the National Register of Historic Places in 1999.

References

Gardens in Indiana
Houses on the National Register of Historic Places in Indiana
Tudor Revival architecture in Indiana
Houses completed in 1926
Buildings and structures in Lake County, Indiana
National Register of Historic Places in Lake County, Indiana